The  is a breed of domestic chicken from the Nord – Pas de Calais region of north-eastern France. It is a variety of the Langshan breed imported to England from China in 1872, and exported from there to Europe soon after. Some were raised in the Pas-de-Calais département, and others in the neighbouring Nord département, particularly in the areas of Estaires, La Gorgue, Laventie and Merville, from which birds were supplied to Lille.

Characteristics

The Estaires breed is closely similar to the Croad Langshan: the comb is small and regularly serrated, the legs are dark slate-blue or almost black and are slightly feathered. The plumage is black with beetle-green lights; there are also gold- and silver-necked colour variants.

References 

Chicken breeds
Chicken breeds originating in France